This is a list of all tornadoes that were confirmed by local offices of the National Weather Service in the United States from January to February 2000.

January

January 3 event

January 9 event

January 16 event

January 24 event

February

February 10 event

February 13 event

February 14 event

February 16 event

February 18 event

February 22 event

February 23 event

February 24 event

February 25 event

February 26 event

February 27 event

February 29 event

Notes

References 

Tornadoes in the United States
2000-1
Tornadoes of 2000
January 2000 events in the United States
February 2000 events in the United States